Medellín Municipality may refer to:
 Medellín Municipality, Antioquia, Colombia
 Medellín Municipality, Veracruz, Mexico

Municipality name disambiguation pages